Faith No More is an American rock band from San Francisco, California, formed in 1979. Before settling on the current name in July 1983, the band performed under the names Sharp Young Men and later Faith No Man. Bassist Billy Gould, keyboardist/rhythm guitarist Roddy Bottum and drummer Mike Bordin are the longest-remaining members of the band, having been involved since its inception. The band underwent several early lineup changes, and some major changes later. The current lineup of Faith No More consists of Gould, Bordin, Bottum, lead guitarist Jon Hudson, and vocalist/lyricist Mike Patton.

After releasing six studio albums, including best-selling records The Real Thing (1989) and Angel Dust (1992), Faith No More officially announced its breakup on April 20, 1998. The band has since reunited, conducting The Second Coming Tour between 2009 and 2010, and releasing its seventh studio album, Sol Invictus, in May 2015. After the touring cycle of Sol Invictus, Faith No More went on hiatus once again. In November 2019, the band announced that it would reunite to embark on a 2020 UK and European tour, but due to the COVID-19 pandemic, this was postponed. Touring was due to recommence with a brief US tour in September 2021, followed by the previously postponed UK and Europe dates in June 2022, but all tour dates were cancelled with Patton citing mental health reasons.

History

Early days (1979–1984)

The genesis of Faith No More was the group Sharp Young Men, formed in 1979 by vocalist Mike Morris and keyboardist Wade Worthington. Drummer Mike Bordin and bassist Billy Gould joined afterwards. Morris called the name "a piss-take on all the 'elegant' groups at the time". Later, he proposed the name Faith In No Man, but eventually the band settled on Bordin's suggestion, Faith No Man (stylized as Faith. No Man). The band recorded "Quiet in Heaven/Song of Liberty", released in 1983. The songs were recorded in Matt Wallace's parents' garage, where Wallace had set up and been running a recording studio while the band was still recording under the name Sharp Young Men, with Morris, Gould, Bordin and Worthington. Worthington left shortly thereafter. The band's name was changed to Faith No Man for the release of the single, which featured two of the three songs recorded in Wallace's garage, and Roddy Bottum replaced Worthington. Bottum, Gould and Bordin quit the band shortly after and formed Faith No More. They chose the name in mid-1983 to accentuate the fact that "The Man" (Morris) was "No More". The band played with several vocalists and guitarists, including a brief stint with Courtney Love, until it settled on vocalist Chuck Mosley in 1983 and, later, guitarist Jim Martin. Their first release under the Faith No More name was a self-titled cassette in 1983, which featured a live performance from that year on Side A, and a 20 minute instrumental track on Side B.

We Care a Lot and Introduce Yourself (1985–1988)

After the name change, the band initially started recording We Care a Lot without backing from a record label and, after pooling their money, recorded five songs. This gained the attention of Ruth Schwartz, who was then forming the independent label Mordam Records, under which the band, after getting the necessary financial support, finished and released the album. It was the first official release for both the band and the label.

In late 1986, Faith No More was signed to Los Angeles label Slash Records by Anna Statman. The label had recently been sold to the Warner Music Group subsidiary London Records, ensuring a widespread release for the band's following albums. Introduce Yourself was released in April 1987, and a revamped version of their debut album's title track "We Care a Lot" saw minor success on MTV. Mosley's behaviour had started to become increasingly erratic, particularly during a troubled tour of Europe in 1988. Incidents include him allegedly punching Billy Gould on stage, the release party for the album Introduce Yourself—during which he fell asleep on stage—and one of Mosley's roadies getting into a fistfight with Martin during the European tour. Mosley was eventually fired after the band returned home from Europe. Gould reflected, "There was a certain point when I went to rehearsal, and Chuck wanted to do all acoustic guitar songs. It was just so far off the mark. The upshot was that I got up, walked out and quit the band. I just said: 'I'm done—I can't take this any longer. It's just so ridiculous'. The same day, I talked to Bordin, and he said: 'Well, I still want to play with you'. Bottum did the same thing. It was another one of these 'firing somebody without firing them' scenarios."

Mike Patton joins and The Real Thing (1989–1991)

Mosley was replaced with singer Mike Patton in 1988. Patton, who was singing with his high school band, Mr. Bungle, was recruited at Martin's suggestion after he heard a demo of Mr. Bungle. According to Patton, he first met the band during a 1986 gig at "a pizza parlor" in his hometown of Eureka, California. Two weeks after joining Faith No More, he had written the lyrics to the songs that made up the Grammy award-nominated The Real Thing, which was released in June 1989.

"Epic" was released in January 1990 and was a top 10 hit. The music video received extensive airplay on MTV in 1990, and angered animal rights activists for a slow motion shot of a fish flopping out of water at the end of the video. That same year, Faith No More performed at the 1990 MTV Video Music Awards (September 6) and on the 293rd episode of Saturday Night Live (December 1). "From Out of Nowhere" and "Falling to Pieces" were released as singles, and a cover of Black Sabbath's "War Pigs" was produced for non-vinyl releases. In 1990, the band went on an extensive U.S. tour, sending The Real Thing to Platinum status in Canada, the U.S., and South America. The album also had big sales numbers in Australia, U.K., and the rest of Europe, pushing the total sales well above 4 million worldwide.

In February 1991, Faith No More released its only official live album, Live at the Brixton Academy. The album includes two previously unreleased studio tracks, "The Grade" and "The Cowboy Song". The same year, the band contributed the song "The Perfect Crime" to the soundtrack to Bill & Ted's Bogus Journey. Martin also made a brief cameo in the film as "Sir James Martin" as the head of the "Faith No More Spiritual and Theological Center". Patton's original band Mr. Bungle went on to sign with Slash and Reprise Records's parent label Warner Bros. Records in 1991, after the worldwide success of The Real Thing.

Angel Dust (1992–1994)
Faith No More displayed an even more experimental effort on its next album, Angel Dust, released in June 1992. One critic wrote that the album is "one of the more complex and simply confounding records ever released by a major label" and another that the single "'A Small Victory', which seems to run Madame Butterfly through Metallica and Nile Rodgers [...] reveals a developing facility for combining unlikely elements into startlingly original concoctions."

Aside from "A Small Victory" (which received a nomination for Best Art Direction at the MTV Video Music Awards), the tracks "Midlife Crisis" and "Everything's Ruined" were also released as singles. The album included a re-recording of the theme to the film Midnight Cowboy, and later pressings included a cover of The Commodores' "Easy", which in some parts of the world became the band's biggest hit. Angel Dust charted one spot higher on the Billboard 200 than The Real Thing, but was not as commercially successful in the U.S., selling 665,000 copies there. It outsold The Real Thing in many other countries. In Germany, the record was certified Gold for sales of more than 250,000 copies. The album also matched the sales of The Real Thing in Canada (Platinum) and Australia (Gold), and surpassed it in the Netherlands, France, Russia, and the U.K. Worldwide sales are around 3.1 million copies.

After touring to support Angel Dust in the summer of 1993, longtime guitarist Martin left the band due to internal conflicts. He was reportedly unhappy with the band's change in musical direction on Angel Dust, calling it "gay disco". According to Bottum, Martin was fired via fax. Martin himself states it was his decision to leave. Both Godflesh guitarist Justin Broadrick and Killing Joke guitarist Geordie Walker were reportedly invited to join Faith No More after Martin's departure, but declined. The position was filled by Mike Patton's Mr. Bungle bandmate Trey Spruance, who left after recording 1995's King for a Day... Fool for a Lifetime, just before the band was to begin its world tour. Spruance was replaced by Dean Menta, the band's keyboard tech.

King for a Day..., Album of the Year and break-up (1995–1998)

Faith No More's fifth studio album, King for a Day... Fool for a Lifetime, was released in March 1995, and varies greatly from song to song in style; punk, country, jazz, bossa nova, thrash metal, gospel music, along with other signature FNM elements, are woven together throughout the album. Singles included "Digging the Grave", "Evidence", and "Ricochet". The album featured Mr. Bungle's Trey Spruance on guitar. The record went Gold in the U.K., Australia, New Zealand, Netherlands and Germany, which gave the album a respectable sales figure of around 1.5 million copies; this was significantly lower than sales of their previous albums. A 7 x 7-inch box set of singles was released, which included the B-sides and some interviews between the songs.

Album of the Year was released in June 1997 and featured yet another new guitarist, Jon Hudson, who was a former roommate of Billy Gould. The album debuted much higher than expected in some countries (for example, in Germany, the album debuted at No. 2 and stayed in the chart for 5 months). In Australia, Album of the Year went to No. 1 and was certified Platinum. The album charted in many countries in Europe. To date, Album of the Year has sold around 2 million copies worldwide. The singles "Ashes to Ashes" and "Last Cup of Sorrow" had minimal success (notably, the music video for "Last Cup of Sorrow", which featured actress Jennifer Jason Leigh, was inspired by the Alfred Hitchcock film Vertigo). "Stripsearch" was released as a single in various countries (excluding the U.S. and U.K.). The album received largely negative reviews from U.S.-based critics at the time. Rolling Stone magazine wrote in their original review "[They] are floundering around desperately, groping for a sense of identity and direction in a decade that clearly finds them irrelevant", while Pitchfork Media stated "Album Of The Year leaves one feeling like waking up and finding last night's used condom – sure, the ride was fun while it lasted, but what remains is just plain icky. And you definitely don't want it in your CD player." Following the album's release, Faith No More toured with Limp Bizkit in 1997, who were frequently booed by Faith No More's fans.

In early 1998, rumors of Faith No More's imminent demise began; commencing with a post to Faith No More newsgroup alt.music.faith-no-more claiming Mike Patton had quit the band in favor of side projects. This rumor, denied at the time, proved to be at least partly true. Faith No More played their last show in Lisbon, Portugal on April 7, 1998. The band cancelled their planned support tour for Aerosmith and on April 20, Billy Gould released a statement by email and fax, saying "[T]he decision among the members is mutual" and "the split will now enable each member to pursue his individual project(s) unhindered." The band "thank[ed] all of those fans and associates that have stuck with and supported the band throughout its history."

Reformation (2009–2012)
Rumours that Faith No More would reunite for shows in the U.K. in the summer of 2009 were circulating in late November 2008, but were originally dismissed by bassist Billy Gould. He explained: "If anything like this were to happen, it would have to come from the band, and I haven't spoken with any of them in over a year. So as far as I know, there isn't anything to talk about, and I'm pretty sure that if you were to contact Patton, he would tell you the same thing."

However, on February 24, 2009, after months of speculation and rumors, Faith No More announced they would be reforming with a line-up identical to the Album of the Year era, embarking on a reunion tour called The Second Coming Tour. To coincide with the band's reunion tour, Rhino released the sixth Faith No More compilation, The Very Best Definitive Ultimate Greatest Hits Collection, a double album that includes their hit singles and b sides & rarities, in the U.K. on June 8. Faith No More then played in major European festivals including Download Festival in the U.K. in June, Hurricane and Southside festivals in Germany, Greenfield Festival in Switzerland, Hove Festival in Norway and Roskilde Festival in Denmark, among other dates. The tour continued into 2010 with appearances at the Soundwave Festival in Australian cities throughout February and March. During their tour, the band added covers to their repertoire including "Poker Face" by Lady Gaga and "Switch" by Siouxsie and the Banshees.

After an eleven-month hiatus, Faith No More played four shows in South America in November 2011. On the first date (November 8, 2011), the band played a "mystery song," which led to speculation of new material. They played Sonisphere France on July 7, 2012. Following several more shows in Europe during 2012, Faith No More became temporarily inactive again. Mike Patton spent 2013 touring with his reformed rock supergroup Tomahawk, while the band's other members also pursued their own side projects. In July 2013, Billy Gould confirmed that the band's hiatus would not be permanent, saying "We will do something again only when all members are with the focus on that, and ready for the challenge. This is not the time... yet."

In a 2015 interview, Roddy Bottum said that the band originally intended to reform with guitarist Jim Martin for their reunion tour, but it did not happen.

Sol Invictus, hiatus and touring (2015–present)
On May 29, 2014, Faith No More posted a message (along with a photograph of Mike Patton) on their Twitter account, saying that "the reunion thing was fun, but now it's time to get a little creative." On July 4, Faith No More played their first show in two years at Hyde Park in London, supporting Black Sabbath. At that show, Faith No More debuted two new songs "Motherfucker" and "Superhero" (also known by fans as "Leader of Men"). On August 20, the band posted "The Reunion Tour is over; in 2015 things are going to change." These tweets led to speculation that the band was working on new material. On August 30, Gould said that the band is "considering doing something new", and may begin work on a new studio album at some point in the not-too-distant future, explaining, "to do something creative would be a really good thing to do." On September 2, Bill Gould revealed to Rolling Stone that the band had begun work on a new album. Faith No More headlined the final edition of Australia's Soundwave in February and March 2015.

The band released their seventh studio album, Sol Invictus, in May 2015. The songs on the album were influenced by The Cramps, Link Wray and Siouxsie and the Banshees. Speaking to Revolver, Gould described the song "Cone of Shame" as "blues-based rock and roll". Describing the song "Matador", he said: "parts of it remind me of the first Siouxsie and the Banshees album. We used real pianos and that brings this organic quality to it to the music". The second single from the album, "Superhero", was shared by the band on March 1, 2015.

In August 2016, the band performed two concerts with former lead singer Chuck Mosley to celebrate the reissue of their debut album We Care a Lot. The band was billed as "Chuck Mosley & Friends" for the two shows and featured the lineup of Mosley, Mike Bordin, Billy Gould, Jon Hudson and Roddy Bottum.

Former Faith No More singer Chuck Mosley died on November 9, 2017, due to "the disease of addiction." He was 57 years old.

In February 2018, it was announced that a documentary film on the late former Faith No More frontman Chuck Mosley had begun production; titled Thanks. And Sorry: The Chuck Mosley Movie, the film is being directed and edited by Drew Fortier and produced by Douglas Esper.

On November 23, 2019, Faith No More updated its official website and social media accounts with an image of the band's eight-pointed star logo in front of a snow-covered mountain top, accompanied by a clock counting down to November 26, 2019; on the latter date, the band announced its first shows in five years set to take place in Europe in June 2020, including Sunstroke Festival in Ireland, Hellfest in France and Tons of Rock in Norway. Less than twenty-four hours later, the Mad Cool Festival in Madrid, Spain, scheduled for July 2020, was added to the list of the band's festival dates. They subsequently rescheduled most of its tour dates, including the Australian and European legs, to 2021 because of the COVID-19 pandemic. The band was scheduled to play two shows at the Banc of California Stadium in Los Angeles with System of a Down, Helmet and Russian Circles, which were initially set to take place May 22–23, 2020, but were postponed twice due to the pandemic, and Faith No More was replaced by Korn. The band was scheduled to play additional shows in September 2021 but these were also cancelled with Mike Patton citing mental health reasons. In a 2022 interview with The Guardian, Patton disclosed that he hasn't spoken to the members of Faith No More since the initial show cancellations leaving the bands future in question.

Musical style and influences
Faith No More's music is generally considered to be alternative metal, experimental rock, alternative rock, and rap metal; however, as Faith No Man, their sound was described as post-punk. The band's first single from 1983, "Quiet in Heaven/Song of Liberty", was labelled as a "solid post-punk/pre-goth single." These elements endured during their tenure with Chucky Mosley, with AllMusic comparing their first album to early Public Image Ltd works, and Mosley's vocals drawing comparisons to Bauhaus lead singer Peter Murphy and H.R. of Bad Brains. By the mid-1980s, Billy Gould stated the band were in a "weird spot", as their eclectic sound didn't fit in with the burgeoning hardcore punk and alternative rock movements of the era. Upon Mike Patton's arrival in 1989, the band began to expand their sound range even further, merging disparate genres such as synth-pop, thrash metal, and carousel music on The Real Thing. Rolling Stone states that by 1997, the band were "too heavy for the post-grunge pop hits of The Verve and Third Eye Blind [and] too arty to work comfortably with the nu metal knuckle-draggers they spawned." Over the course of their career, they have experimented with heavy metal, funk, hip hop, progressive rock, alternative rock, hardcore punk, polka, country, easy listening, jazz, samba, ska, bossa nova, hard rock, pop, soul, trip hop, gospel, and lounge music.

Faith No More's lyrics have been described as "bizarrely humorous". When interviewed about his lyrics, Patton responded, "I think that too many people think too much about my lyrics. I am more a person who works more with the sound of a word than with its meaning. Often I just choose the words because of the rhythm, not because of the meaning."

In addition to the band's subsequently more apparent metal influences, like Black Sabbath and Ozzy Osbourne, Bordin acknowledged many gothic rock and post-punk bands as early influences, including Siouxsie and the Banshees, The Cure, Psychedelic Furs, Echo and the Bunnymen, Killing Joke, Public Image Ltd, and Theatre of Hate. Upon reforming, Faith No More returned to these influences on Sol Invictus.

Legacy
In a 2015 article by Artistdirect, the musicians Duff McKagan, Chino Moreno, Serj Tankian, Corey Taylor, Max Cavalera and Jonathan Davis all praised the band for their significance and influence. Nirvana bassist, and co-founder, Krist Novoselic cited Faith No More as a band that "paved the way for Nirvana" in the late 1980s. Robert Plant, singer of Led Zeppelin, mentioned the then Chuck Mosley-led Faith No More as one of his current favorite bands in a 1988 interview with Rolling Stone. Plant and Faith No More subsequently toured together following The Real Things release. Scott Ian of Anthrax has also named Faith No More as one of his favorite bands.

Corey Taylor (frontman for both Slipknot and Stone Sour) told Loudwire in 2015 that if it wasn't for Faith No More, he "wouldn't be here today." While recovering from an attempted suicide at his grandmother's house, he saw the band perform "Epic" live on the 1990 MTV Video Music Awards and the performance inspired him to begin writing and performing music again.

They were voted No. 52 on VH1's "100 Greatest Artists of Hard Rock". The band is credited for inventing the alternative metal genre which began in the 1980s and that fuses metal with other genres, including alternative rock. Tim Grierson of About.com said the band "helped put alternative metal on the map." Faith No More has also been credited for influencing nu metal bands, such as Limp Bizkit, Korn, and Sevendust, primarily due to the popularity of "Epic", and other early material that featured rap and rock crossovers. Papa Roach vocalist Jacoby Shaddix, a self-confessed fan of the band, stated in a 2015 interview "They fused some of that hip-hop and rock together. They were one of the earliest bands to do that, and definitely pioneers to a whole genre. If you listen to Korn, if you listen to how the bass and the drums lock up, it's quite similar to how Faith No More was doing it in their early years." In a 2019 interview on the Australian channel Rage's Midnight Show, Tobias Forge, leader of the Swedish rock band Ghost, explained what the band meant to him by saying, "In the 90s there were a few bands that I liked a lot, and still like to this day, that are consecutively hard to niche. One band is Faith No More. Who knows what they play? No one knows really. It's a synth band? No. Is it a heavy metal band? No, not really. It's just a really, really good rock band."

Faith No More have been covered by prominent metal acts such as 36 Crazyfists, Apocalyptica, Atreyu, Between the Buried and Me, Disturbed, Five Finger Death Punch, Helloween, Ill Niño, Korn, Machine Head, Papa Roach, Redemption, Revocation, Sentenced, Slaves on Dope and Trail of Tears. In 2002, a tribute album titled Tribute of the Year (a reference to Faith No More's Album of the Year) was released by Underground Inc. It featured 30 Faith No More songs covered by mostly unknown independent hardcore punk, industrial and alternative metal acts.

The band and their 1989 single "Epic" have frequently been cited as an example of an '80s or '90s one-hit wonder. Flavorwire stated in 2014 "Although the band always had a loyal fan base and Patton remains an indie hero, they only cracked the Billboard Hot 100 once, with Epic." Others have noted that after "Epics success, the band still managed to remain highly popular in regions outside North America: including Australia, South America, Europe and the U.K. The band's original final record Album of the Year notably experienced high sales in countries such as Australia (where it went platinum), New Zealand and Germany, while being deemed a commercial failure in their native USA.

After the release of The Real Thing, a feud developed between Faith No More and fellow funk-influenced Californian group Red Hot Chili Peppers, whom they had previously played with on The Uplift Mofo Party Tour, while Chuck Mosley was still Faith No More's lead singer. Over the years, the feud has largely been fueled by the media, including TV personalities such as Greg Gutfeld. Despite this, various members of Faith No More and Red Hot Chili Peppers appear to have remained on good terms since the initial controversy. Regarding the perceived conflict, Red Hot Chili Peppers bassist Flea stated in a mid-90s interview, "There was never any fight between us, that was a bunch of bullshit created by the media. I mean I think they're a good band. Maybe there was some things said between Anthony and the singer [Patton], but it all means nothing to me. Those guys in the band are nice people and there's no fight." At a 2014 show in Brooklyn, Red Hot Chili Peppers also notably covered a portion of the Chuck Mosley-era song "We Care a Lot".

Concert tours
 1979–1984: Early shows
 1985–1986: We Care a Lot Tour
 1987–1988: Introduce Yourself Tour
 1989–1991: The Real Thing Tour
 1992–1993: Angel Dust Tour
 1995: King for a Day Tour
 1997–1998: Album of the Year Tour
 2009–2012: The Second Coming Tour
 2015: Soundwave Tour
 2015: Sol Invictus Tour

Band members

Current members
Mike Bordin – drums, percussion, backing vocals (1981–1998; 2009–present)
Billy Gould – bass, backing vocals (1981–1998; 2009–present)
Roddy Bottum – keyboards, rhythm guitar, backing vocals (1983–1998; 2009–present)
Mike Patton – lead vocals (1988–1998; 2009–present)
Jon Hudson – lead guitar, backing vocals (1996–1998; 2009–present)

Awards and nominations
Brit Awards

|-
| 1991 || Faith No More || International Group || 

Grammy Awards

|-
| 1990 || "The Real Thing" || Best Metal Performance || 
|-
| 1991 || "Epic" || Best Hard Rock Performance || 
|-
| 1993 || "Angel Dust" || Best Hard Rock Performance || 

Metal Hammer Golden Gods Awards

|-
| 2015 || Sol Invictus || Best Album || 

Metal Storm Awards

|-
| 2015 || Sol Invictus || Best Alternative Metal Album || 

MTV Video Music Awards

|-
| 1990 || "Epic" || Best Heavy Metal/Hard Rock Video || 
|-
| 1991 || "Falling to Pieces" || Best Art Direction in a Video || 
|-
| 1991 || "Falling to Pieces" || Best Heavy Metal/Hard Rock Video || 
|-
| 1991 || "Falling to Pieces" || Best Visual Effects in a Video || 
|-
| 1993 || "A Small Victory" || Best Art Direction in a Video ||

Discography

Studio albums
We Care a Lot (1985)
Introduce Yourself (1987)
The Real Thing (1989)
Angel Dust (1992)
King for a Day... Fool for a Lifetime (1995)
Album of the Year (1997)
Sol Invictus (2015)

See also
 List of bands from the San Francisco Bay Area
 List of alternative metal artists
 List of funk metal and funk rock bands

Notes
1.  The song was recorded in 1988 and first appeared on 1989's The Real Thing, although it gained popularity after being released as a single in 1990.

References

Bibliography

 .
Prato, Greg (2013). The Faith No More & Mr. Bungle Companion. Createspace. .
Harte, Adrian (2018). Small Victories: The True Story of Faith No More. Jawbone Press. .

External links

 
 
 
 Faith No More in Concert

 
American alternative metal musical groups
American post-punk music groups
Heavy metal musical groups from California
American funk metal musical groups
American experimental rock groups
Musical groups disestablished in 1998
Musical groups established in 1979
Musical groups from San Francisco
Slash Records artists
Ipecac Recordings artists
Musical groups reestablished in 2009
Mission District, San Francisco
Musical quintets
Alternative rock groups from California